Alan Pyle (born 27 August 1946) is a Canadian water polo player. He competed in the men's tournament at the 1972 Summer Olympics.

References

1946 births
Living people
Canadian male water polo players
Olympic water polo players of Canada
Water polo players at the 1972 Summer Olympics
Sportspeople from Toronto